The 1896-97 Football League season was the ninth in Football League history with Everton having been an ever present in the top division. The club played thirty-five games in England's two major competitions, winning eighteen, drawing three and losing fourteen. The club finished the season in seventh place, eight points clear of the test match relegation place, and reached their second FA Cup final but again lost, this time 2-3 against Aston Villa.

Season review
In each of the previous two seasons Everton had started the calendar year on top of the League, only to falter in the second half of the season. In their bid to strengthen the forward line they brought in Jack Taylor from his hometown club St Mirren, slotting into the role vacated by Tom McInnes who had departed during the summer for Luton Town to join the forward line of Bell, Chadwick, Milward and Hartley.

Elsewhere the familiar half back line of Boyle, Holt & Stewart would line up in front of full back, Smart Arridge, who would be partnered in defence this year by David Storrier after James Adams had returned to his former club Hearts

On paper this side looked as good as any in the First Division but there was uncertainty over the ability of the inexperienced goalkeeper, Harry Briggs, who had stepped in to make just one appearance the previous season after the departure of Jack Hillman.

With the exception of the inclusion of John Cameron in place of Hartley, this was the team that won their opening game against The Wednesday, while Barker made his debut at the back, in place of Arridge in their second game, another victory over Wolves that took the Toffeemen joint top of the table with Bolton, albeit already having a game in hand on the Trotters. The Merseysiders went on to win four of their opening five games before embarking on a dreadful slump that provided just a solitary victory in their next nine games.

The change initially looked to have been a wise one as, shortly after Menham's arrival, Everton embarked on a run of seven consecutive League and Cup victories to put themselves right back into the title race, four points behind leaders, Aston Villa with ten games remaining.

The last of those victories was Everton's first round cup tie with Burton Wanderers and it seemed that the cup run once again affected their League form as they now went on a run of six consecutive League defeats which killed any lingering title ambitions.

First team squad and appearances

Final league table

Key: P = Matches played; W = Matches won; D = Matches drawn; L = Matches lost; F = Goals for; A = Goals against; GA = Goal average; Pts = Points

The Football League
Everton home games were played at Goodison Park while away games were played at the venues stated

References

Everton F.C. seasons
Everton